Glostrup FK is a Danish football club which plays in the Danish 2nd Division East. They play at Glostrup Stadion in Glostrup on Zealand, which has a capacity of 4,000. 

The club was formed in 2003 as a merger between Glostrup IF 32, Glostrup IC and Hvissinge FC. In 2009 the club was merged with Albertslund IF to form Boldklubberne Glostrup Albertslund. This merger was dissolved in 2015, and Glostrup FK reappeared in the Zealand Series.

External links
Mother club official website (Danish)
Support society (Danish)

Football clubs in Denmark
Association football clubs established in 1932
1932 establishments in Denmark
Association football clubs disestablished in 2009
Association football clubs established in 2015